Guiney is an Irish surname is mainly found in Cork and Kerry, also in the forms 'Guinee' and 'Geaney'. The name 'MacGuiney', a variant of 'MacGeaney', is found in County Cavan.

Notable people with the surname include: 

Ben Guiney, American baseball player
Bob Guiney, star of the fourth season of The Bachelor
Louise Imogen Guiney, American poet
Mary Guiney, chairperson of the Clerys department store group
Patrick Guiney, Irish Nationalist politician
Patrick Robert Guiney, American Civil War soldier
Rod Guiney, Irish sportsperson

See also
Guineys, a department store in Ireland

References